Tunnel rat or similar can mean:
 Tunnel rat in the Vietnam War
 1968 Tunnel Rats, a 2008 film
 Tunnel Rats (video game), a videogame based on the movie
 Tunnel Rat (G.I. Joe), a fictional character in the G.I. Joe universe
 Tunnel Rats (music group), an underground hip hop collective
 Tunnel Rats (album), the third album by Tunnel Rats